The Perpignan–Barcelona high-speed line is an international high-speed rail line between France and Spain. It crosses the French–Spanish border via the  Perthus Tunnel bored under the Perthus Pass, connecting two cities on opposite sides of the border, Perpignan in Roussillon, France, and Figueres in Catalonia, Spain. The line extends to Barcelona, and this part is sometimes referenced as an extension of the Madrid–Barcelona high-speed rail line. The Perpignan–Barcelona line is a part of the Mediterranean Corridor.

History
The construction contract for the international section of the line between Perpignan and Figueres was awarded on 17 February 2004 to the TP Ferro consortium, a joint venture of Eiffage (France) and Dragados (Spain). The group constructed the line for an estimated cost of approximately €1.1 billion, and will operate it for 53 years. It received a public subsidy of €540 million, split between the European Union, France and Spain.

Test running started in November 2008, and the international section officially opened on 17 February 2009, but services were delayed until December 2010 because the station at Figueres was not finished. Services in the section started on 19 December 2010 with a TGV service from Paris via Perpignan to Figueres–Vilafant and regular freight traffic started on 21 December 2010. Eventually the  international section was officially inaugurated on 27 January 2011.

The Spanish  Barcelona–Figueres section was originally planned to open in 2009 but there were delays in building a 4-kilometre tunnel in Girona, the first phase of which was finished in September 2010, and controversy over the route between Sants and Sagrera stations in Barcelona. The section was eventually completed in January 2013 at a cost of €3.7 billion and the entire line officially opened on 8 January 2013.

Line
The track on the new line is standard gauge using 25 kV AC railway electrification at 50 Hz, consistent with the French LGV and Spanish AVE high-speed rail networks. The line is used by both passenger and freight trains, the maximum grade being limited to 12 ‰.

This line was the first rail connection between Spain and the rest of Europe constructed without a break-of-gauge and the first international connection to the standard-gauge Spanish AVE network. Traditional Spanish rail lines are broad gauge based on the Spanish vara , so rail connections between France and Spain have traditionally involved a break-of-gauge, implying that passengers and cargo must either change trains, or the trains must pass through gauge-changing installations at the border. Another same-gauge connection to France is planned near the Atlantic coast in the Basque country, and a third link via Huesca crossing the central Pyrenees mountains through a  tunnel is under study.

Services
A TGV service from Paris via Perpignan started on 19 December 2010 to a temporary station at Figueres and a connecting service on the classic line on to Barcelona and Madrid. The total journey time from Paris to Barcelona has been reduced by 1h 15m to 7h 25m (current Paris-Barcelona travel time by train is 6h 41m). Of that, 5h 30m was spent on the Paris to Figueres segment. Initially there was a service of two Paris-Figueres TGVs per day, which connected with two RENFE Alvia trains a day between Barcelona and Figueres via the conventional broad gauge line and a temporary double gauge track. From January 2013 there was a service of nine RENFE AVE trains a day between Figueres and Barcelona with eight services continuing on to Madrid.

RENFE started a standard-gauge freight service on 21 December 2010. As of January 2011 four freight trains a week run over the line from Barcelona, with journey times reduced by 6 hours: one train each way to Lyon, and one each way to Milan.

On 28 November 2013, RENFE and SNCF announced the opening of direct long-distance services from 15 December 2013, with daily trains between Paris – Barcelona, Toulouse – Barcelona, Lyon – Barcelona, Marseille – Madrid. Since December 2013 the journey time for the TGV Paris–Barcelona service has been 6 hours 25 minutes.

Expansion

Operating
Lyon to Barcelona is expected to take less than four hours using the standard line in France between Perpignan and Nîmes. A new company jointly owned by RENFE and SNCF is to be formed to run services between Paris and Madrid. Ten new trains are to be purchased at a cost of €300 million.

Tendering for the Nîmes–Montpellier bypass route started in May 2010. This is the first stage in the link between the Spanish high-speed network and LGV Méditerranée and the line will carry a mix of freight and high-speed trains. A 25-year Public–Private Partnership agreement was signed in June 2012, construction works completed in December 2017 and the first passenger services to Montpellier Sud de France station commenced on 7 July 2018.

Future
Work on the  LGV Montpellier–Perpignan is not expected to start before 2020, following public consultation beginning 2015. However, the preliminary high-speed route and station locations were approved by the French transport ministry in February 2016. Construction for the Montpellier-Béziers section is forecast to last 10 years, while another 10 years will be needed to construct the Béziers-Perpignan section.

See also
 High-speed rail in Spain
 TGV
 AVE- Spanish high-speed train service

References

External links
 LGV Map on Google Maps
 A photo of the end of the line
 Perpignan–Barcelona in 50 mins
 Entry on Ferrocarriles wiki 

High-speed railway lines in Spain
Perpignan-Figueres
Perpignan
International railway lines
France–Spain border crossings
Railway lines opened in 2010
Transport in Occitania (administrative region)
2010 establishments in France
2010 establishments in Spain